Thomas Shirley (by 1489–1544), of West Grinstead, Sussex, was an English politician.

Family
His brother, Richard Shirley, was an MP for Sussex. He married Elizabeth Gorges and they had four daughters and two sons, including Francis Shirley MP.

Career
He was a Member (MP) of the Parliament of England for Steyning in 1529.

References

15th-century births
1544 deaths
English MPs 1529–1536
People from West Grinstead